Weem is the third album by Scottish indie rock band De Rosa. It was released on 22 January 2016 on Rock Action Records. It was recorded in 2012 Weem and Loch Fyne by the band, and mixed by Andy Miller. <br/ >
While the band recorded the album as a five piece, Chris Connick and Andy Bush left the band after its completion.

The Album borrows three tracks from the 2008 Appendices (which was released one track per month over the course of the year).

Accolades

Track listing 
 Spectres - 5:53
 Lanes - 3:30
 Chip on My Shoulder - 3:48
 Scott Fank Juniper - 4:25
 Falling Water - 3:05
 Fausta - 3:25
 Prelude to Entropic Doom - 3:45
 The Sea Cup - 3:35
 Devils - 4:37
 Lanes (Reprise) - 1:26
 The Mute - 3:39

Personnel 
 Martin John Henry – vocals, guitars
 James Woodside – bass
 Neil Woodside – drums
 Chris Connick – guitars
 Andrew Bush – piano

References

External links
Official Website
Rock Action Records

Rock Action Records albums
De Rosa (band) albums
2016 albums